The College of International Education (CIE) is a private college located in Oxford, England. CIE offers General English language courses for adults and juniors, Business Foundation courses, and Young Learners courses such as Pre-boarding and Pre-International Baccalaureate. During the academic year, class sizes usually contain no more than 8 students.

CIE's Bocardo House is in the centre of Oxford, opposite the Oxford Union. The summer school is also held in city centre facilities, such as Oxford University's Lady Margaret Hall, near the University Parks.

CIE is a subsidiary of United Travel Study Service (UK), which is an affiliate of United Travel Study Service (UTS) of Japan.

References

External links 
 
 Facebook Page
 Blog

Schools in Oxford
Language schools in the United Kingdom
Schools of English as a second or foreign language